Melbourne Village is a town in Brevard County, Florida. The population was 662 at the 2010 United States Census. It is part of the Palm Bay–Melbourne–Titusville Metropolitan Statistical Area, and is the smallest incorporated municipality (by population) in Brevard County.

History

The area that is now the town was previously used for raising cattle.  Aerial photographs from circa 1943 of the area show some native oak hammocks, pine lowlands, and cleared areas for cattle grazing.

Virginia Wood, Elizabeth Nutting, and Margaret Hutchinson came from Dayton, Ohio, following the end of World War II to the area of Melbourne, Florida. Their goal was to build a community from scratch for people wanting to establish a lifestyle that was simple and close to nature. This social experiment was an “intentional community”, a response to the hardships of the Great Depression. The founders were influenced by the concepts and teachings of Ralph Borsodi, who also lived in Melbourne Village from 1950 to 1960.  Many early residents cleared their land, built their own houses, and ran small home businesses, from organic gardening to raising chinchillas, in order to help support themselves and their families.  There was a community store run on the honor system.  Early families overcame the lack of construction materials for civilian use immediately following World War II by purchasing and relocating surplus military barracks from nearby bases.  Two of these barracks still remain, one being the Original Melbourne Village Hall and the other a private residence.

The Town of Melbourne Village was incorporated in 1957 out of concern of being annexed by Melbourne or included in the subsequent incorporation of West Melbourne.

Geography

According to the United States Census Bureau, the town has a total area of 0.6 square miles (1.0 km), primarily land, with several small ponds.

The village is surrounded by West Melbourne, except the northeastern portion of the town, where it is bordered by Melbourne.

Environment

It is common in Melbourne Village for a lot to have at least 30% canopy coverage, from mature live oaks and southern pines.

Erna Nixon Park

The eastern section of the town includes a portion of the Erna Nixon Park.  The park's namesake and Melbourne Village resident, Erna Nixon, was a force behind the preservation of the  area.  This park is surrounded by a commercial district to the east, and a residential area to the west.  Her work, with assistance from the Junior League of South Brevard, convinced the county and state to purchase the land and establish the Erna Nixon Park.  The park opened in 1976 and is a key habitat for many native plants, birds, and animals, including gopher tortoises, indigo snakes, and bobcats.

Climate

Government

The Town of Melbourne Village is governed by a Town Commission of seven members, one of whom is the Mayor/Commissioner.  By town charter, these are unpaid positions.  The Mayor and Commissioners are non-partisan positions and are elected in November during the general elections for two year terms. Terms are staggered, with three commission seats up for election each year plus the mayoral seat up every other year.  Each year, the Commission elects one of their members as the Vice Mayor.  The Commission meets at least once a month to deal with town business, in a modified "town hall"-style meeting.  This form of government is a mixture of the "Council-Manager" and the "Mayor-Council" systems, as the Mayor is elected (rather than appointed) yet does have a vote on the Commission.  While the Mayor is responsible for the day-to-day executive oversight and guidance for the town (in essence, the Town's "city manager"), the Commission can reverse or direct the Mayor's actions.

Three departments serve the town with paid employees:  Administration, Public Works, and Police.  Even though the municipality is small, having its own police force enables the town to provide 24/7 coverage with fast response times, as well as community policing activities.

American Homesteading Foundation (AHF)

The American Homesteading Foundation was the entity behind the founding of Melbourne Village. All homeowners in the town are given the option of being members of the AHF. The AHF was founded in 1946 by Virginia Wood, Elizabeth Nutting, and Margaret Hutchinson, and is a not-for-profit corporation and independent of the official municipality. The AHF serves the community by owning, maintaining, and operating all the community property within the town, and sponsors recreational and educational activities throughout the year. In its modern form, the main function of the AHF is sometimes described as an independent self-funded Parks and Recreation department for the town's residents.

Community involvement

More than 25 percent of the residents of Melbourne Village are routinely involved in committees and volunteer events.  In the 2008 elections, voter turnout for Melbourne Village (Precinct 31) was 95 percent. Even in non-presidential election years, turnout is typically 60 percent to 80 percent.

Planned development

The Vision 2012 Committee was chartered by the Town Commission in March 2006 as a response to trends and concerns about recent construction that, if not addressed, could significantly change the existing neighborhood character via the larger size of structures, greater lot coverage, and the loss of green-space.

The result of this work was the Responsible Growth Plan, a set of ordinances that developed building coverage ranges for all lot sizes, devised incentive strategies to encourage homeowners and builders to minimize the visual and environmental impact of larger lot coverage, improved the town's code emphasis on tree canopy, green conservation, and native vegetation, and provided a way to manage all these objectives via the Town Review Board.

Mayors

 1957–1957: W. Harries Fisher
 1957–1961: Clark J. Strohmer
 1961–1968: Arthur A. Codding
 1968–1969: A. Harold Peters
 1969–1970: Clemens J. Neuhaus
 1970–1972: Albert G. Falco
 1972–1975: Raymond E. Henderson
 1975–1978: Grace D. Walker
 1978–1978: Albert F. Zimmerman
 1978–1980: Herbert C. Doughty
 1980–1982: A. Harold Peters
 1982–1992: George T. Woodmansee
 1992–1996: James A. Miller
 1996–2000: Julia E. (Tibby) Parker
 2000–2002: Richard F. St. John
 2002–2004: Robert E. Downey
 2004–2008: Stephen J. Gaul
 2008–2012: L. Scott McCoy
 2012–2014: Robert E. Downey
 2014–2018: Rand Carroll
 2018–2020: Heidi A. Salmon
 2020–2021: Willow W. Martin
 2021–current: Tabitha Niemann

Demographics

As of the census of 2000, there were 706 people, 307 households, and 210 families residing in the town. It has the smallest population of any municipality in the county.

The racial makeup of the town was 99.01% White, 0.71% Asian, and 0.28% from two or more races. Hispanic or Latino of any race were 1.27% of the population.

There were 307 households, out of which 21.2% had children under the age of 18 living with them, 59.0% were married couples living together, 5.2% had a female householder with no husband present, and 31.3% were non-families. 25.4% of all households were made up of individuals, and 14.7% had someone living alone who was 65 years of age or older. The average household size was 2.30 and the average family size was 2.73.

In the town, the population was spread out, with 17.8% under the age of 18, 3.5% from 18 to 24, 22.7% from 25 to 44, 29.7% from 45 to 64, and 26.2% who were 65 years of age or older. The median age was 49 years. For every 100 females, there were 93.4 males. For every 100 females age 18 and over, there were 95.3 males.

The median income for a household in the town was $48,750, and the median income for a family was $60,000. Males had a median income of $51,058 versus $27,375 for females. The per capita income for the town was $27,782. About 2.6% of families and 6.4% of the population were below the poverty line, including 9.3% of those under age 18 and 3.3% of those age 65 or over.

See also

 Original Melbourne Village Hall

References

External links

 
 American Homesteading Foundation
 Melbourne Village Police Department

Towns in Brevard County, Florida
Populated places established in 1946
Towns in Florida
1946 establishments in Florida